The Chrysler Town & Country is an automobile which was manufactured by Chrysler from 1940 to 1942 and from 1945 to 1988 with production interrupted during World War II. Primarily produced as a luxury station wagon, the Town & Country was also available in "woodie" four-door sedan, two-door hardtop and convertible body styles from 1947 to 1950, 1968 to 1969 and from 1983 to 1986. The 1988 model year was the last for the station wagon until the 1990 model year when Chrysler reintroduced the Town & Country nameplate as the rebadged variant Chrysler Town & Country minivan.

Chrysler's Town & Country wagon was reintroduced with all-steel construction in 1951, in both Windsor and New Yorker variants through the end of Windsor model production for the 1960 model year, and then in Newport and New Yorker models through 1965. In 1966 it became a stand-alone model, with trim and features which bridged the gap between the two sedan lines. It was distinguished by luxury features including a carpeted rear cargo area with split-folding second row bench seats trimmed with chrome covered strips of steel, and from 1968 forward, simulated woodgrain paneling on the body sides and tailgate, a feature also associated with somewhat competitive top-shelf station wagons such as the AMC Ambassador, Buick Estate, Oldsmobile Custom Cruiser, Ford Country Squire, and the Mercury Colony Park, and in 1976 AMC introduced the Jeep Grand Wagoneer with similar passenger accommodation and a simulated woodgrain appearance built on a dedicated chassis. The Town and Country, however, stood in a luxury class by itself until the last of the full-sized versions of 1977. From 1978, it was sized down and absorbed into the LeBaron series, with a lesser version lacking the more luxurious features and the woodgrain bodyside decals available for a few years in the early 1980s.

Chrysler reintroduced the Town & Country nameplate in 1989 as a luxury rebadged variant of the Dodge Grand Caravan/Plymouth Grand Voyager minivan for the 1990 model year and continued to sell this incarnation of the Chrysler Town & Country until the end of the 2016 model year when Chrysler reintroduced the Pacifica nameplate for their minivan in 2016 for the 2017 model year.

A simulated woodgrain appearance reappeared on other Chrysler products, such as the 1993 Jeep Grand Cherokee (ZJ) and the Chrysler PT Cruiser.

1941–1942

1941

During the 1941 model year, the 1941 Chrysler Town & Country four-door, eight-passenger station wagon made its debut as Chrysler's entry to offer wooden doors and body panels, or "woodie" with an all-steel roof. Using wood in vehicle production was not a new approach as most cars built from the 1900s through 1930s regularly used wood for body support, flooring or structural uses. It used the roof of the concurrent Chrysler Imperial 4-door 8-passenger limousine, which led to a rear-loading configuration with wooden double doors (also called 'Barrel Back' doors) that opened out from the center beneath the fixed backlight (rear window). The wooden body framing was made from white ash and the panels were Honduran mahogany veneer and the use of wood carried over to the interior trunk lid and the interior door panels as well, not just an exterior appearance. The wood panels were provided by Perkins Wood Products and the Chrysler owners manual suggested that the wood panels be varnished every six months.

The nameplate "Town & Country" was coined due to another nameplate Chrysler offered for another six passenger sedan sold called the "Town Sedan" on the Windsor, Saratoga and New Yorker product lines from 1941 to 1942.

It was introduced with the straight-six engine as an alternative to the Buick Estate, Oldsmobile Series 60 and Packard One-Ten woodie station wagons, and was installed in the Series C-28 Chrysler Windsor offering six or nine passenger accommodation with a six-cylinder engine, or the Series C-30 Chrysler Saratoga with the straight-eight engine and nine passenger accommodation of which only one was specially requested for 1941, and was offered as a response to the eight-cylinder Buick Super and the Packard One-Twenty woodie station wagons. Prices listed for the six-cylinder Series C-28 Windsor wagon were US$1,492 ($ in  dollars ). Production totals record that vehicles that were installed with the six-cylinder engine documented 200 six-passenger wagons were made and 797 nine-passenger wagons found buyers.

1942

The 1942 model year Town & Country had an abbreviated production run due to the U.S.' entry into World War II. Less than one-thousand units had been produced since the vehicle's introduction a year earlier. The wagon that was installed with the straight-eight was moved to the New Yorker model line from the previous Saratoga with only one New Yorker Town & Country wagon specially manufactured, while the straight-six remained with the Windsor product line and 999 total wagons made in six and nine passenger configurations.

1946-1950

1946
After World War II, the Town & Country nameplate returned, though the 4-door 8-passenger station wagon did not. Only the 1946 Town & Country 4-door sedan and the 1946 Town & Country 2-door convertible were offered; however, the 1946 Town & Country sales brochure also described and illustrated a roadster, a 2-door sedan called the Brougham, and a 2-door hardtop called the Custom Club Coupe. None of those three additional body styles progressed beyond the prototype stage, with one Brougham and seven Custom Club Coupes built; it would be another three model years before General Motors would offer the first mass-produced 2-door hardtops, while the Town & Country range would not see a production 2-door hardtop until one model year after that. The wooden body framing was made from white ash and the panels were mahogany veneer but were now bonded to steel body panels. The average retail price was listed at US$2,609 ($ in  dollars ) and production totals were documented at 2,169.

1947
During the 1947 model year, the 1947 Town & Country 4-door sedan and the 1947 2-door convertible each carried over with just a few improvements over the previous model year (1946).

1948
During the 1948 model year, while the 1948 Town & Country 4-door sedan was in its last model year of production ever after only a three-model-year production run (since the 1946 model year), the 1948 Town & Country 2-door convertible carried over with just very few improvements over the previous model year (1947). This was also the year the genuine Honduran mahogany wood panels were replaced by DI-NOC vinyl panels. A similar appearance sedan was also introduced in 1948 called the Packard Station Sedan which appeared like a sedan but had a two-piece tailgate constructed entirely of wood.

1949
The 1949 Town & Country 2-door convertible, which carried over with so very few improvements over the previous model year (1948), was in its last model year of production, which was the only Chrysler Town & Country offering during the 1949 model year after a four-model-year production run (since the 1946 model year), during the next model year (1950), Chrysler would produce the last true woodie offering—ever—as the Town & Country Newport 2-door hardtop. The cars for 1949 were first Chrysler's new postwar designs, with a longer wheelbase (131.5 in), based upon the New Yorker model.

1950
The 1950 Town & Country 2-door hardtop was Chrysler's last true woodie offering during its one-model-year production run while the panels were now simulated. This was also the year a new optional feature was available, windshield washers which are now a standard feature on all cars worldwide.

The 1950 Crosley Hot Shot is often given credit for the first production disc brakes but the Chrysler Imperial Crown actually had them first as standard equipment at the start of the 1949 model year. The Chrysler 4-wheel disc brake system was built by Auto Specialties Manufacturing Company (Ausco) of St. Joseph, Michigan, under patents of inventor H.L. Lambert, and was first tested on a 1939 Plymouth. Unlike the caliper disc, the Ausco-Lambert utilized twin expanding discs that rubbed against the inner surface of a cast-iron brake drum, which doubled as the brake housing.

The Ausco-Lambert disc brake was complex, and because of the expense, the brakes were only standard on the Chrysler Imperial Crown through 1954 and the Town and Country Newport in 1950. They were optional, however, on other Chryslers, priced around $400 ($ in  dollars ), at a time when an entire Crosley Hot Shot retailed for $935 ($ in  dollars ).

1951–1959 

After the woodie coupes, sedans and convertibles were discontinued, the Town & Country nameplate was used on an all steel-bodied full-size rear wheel drive station wagon, coinciding with the debut of the company's first V8 engine which was originally called FireDome, but later unofficially called HEMI. This wagon introduced several firsts, including roll-down rear windows for tailgates for 1951 and rear-facing third-row seats for 1957 and shared the chassis, engine, transmission and interior luxury features including a simulated leather and broadcloth upholstery with the Chrysler Imperial. The previous generations use of wood panneling bonded to the exterior steel body panels was discontinued due to durability and appearance upkeep issues, while it was still available on the DeSoto Firedome and Dodge Coronet. Production totals for the 1951 Windsor Town & Country were 1,967, 1,299 Saratoga Town & Country and 251 New Yorker Town & Country with the New Yorker station wagon listed at US$4,026 ($ in  dollars ). The Town & Country was luxurious and expensive and sold in limited numbers, averaging 1,900 each year for both the Windsor and New Yorker versions, while the Windsor Deluxe sedan typically sold 64,000 and the New Yorker Deluxe sedan 34,000 each year, averaging US$2,660 ($ in  dollars ) for the Windsor sedan and US$3,494 ($ in  dollars ) for the New Yorker sedan.

The 1951 Town & Country wagons were offered in the Windsor, Saratoga and New Yorker series, and featured standard equipment split folding second row seats with a hardwood covered cargo area with chrome covered steel load strips to aid in loading cargo, an appearance that remained for several decades. For 1955 Chrysler introduced the 2-speed PowerFlite automatic which was a dashboard installed "Finger-Tip" lever replacing the steering column installed gear selector, then in 1956 the 3-speed TorqueFlite automatic with mechanically operated pushbuttons to the left of the steering wheel was standard equipment until 1965. The New Yorker version was discontinued for 1952, but reappeared for 1953 when the Saratoga series was dropped.

For 1953, power windows, a heater and windshield defroster, windshield washer jets, power steering and power assist brakes were first installed on all Chryslers as optional equipment and there were 41 different exterior color combinations to choose from. Two-speed windshield wipers also were installed as standard equipment as well as directional turn signals and full floor carpeting. For 1954 "Air-Temp" air conditioning was offered as an option along with "Solex" tinted windshield. 1955 saw an all-new appearance for Chrysler products called "The 100-Million Dollar Look" from Virgil Exner with a longer, lower and wider stance that saw successful sales, including the Town & Country while production totals were still modest for the luxury segment. The "Super-Scenic" wraparound windshield greatly improved outward visibility and a power adjustable front bench seat was now optional along with wire spoke wheels.

Production totals for 1956 continued to be modest for both the Windsor Town & Country and the New Yorker Town & Country, averaging 2,700 for the Windsor and 1,070 for the New Yorker with a retail price of US$3,598 ($ in  dollars ) for the Windsor and US$4,523 ($ in  dollars ) for the New Yorker. The Windsor version remained through 1960, then was moved to the new Newport series for 1961. The new "Forward Look" was a sales success for Chrysler but not for the Town & Country. By 1959 the Windsor Town & Country manufactured just 751 and the New Yorker made 444 with still an expensive price tag of US$3,878 ($ in  dollars ) for the Windsor and US$4,997 ($ in  dollars ) for the New Yorker.

1960–1964

For model years 1960 through 1962, the New Yorker Town and Country remained on the 126-inch wheelbase, while first the Windsor then the Newport Town and Country models rode a wheelbase of 122 inches. These were the roomiest factory-bodied, automobile-based station wagons on the market at the time. Chrysler also introduced hardtop styling as standard on Chrysler-branded models for the first time.  These were the first large wagons, and among the largest automobiles with unibody construction. The 1960 New Yorker Town & Country nine passenger station wagon was US$5,131 ($ in  dollars ) and 671 were recorded to have been manufactured. Starting in 1958, Chryslers were optionally equipped with Captive-Aire tires that remained inflated regardless of a tire puncture for $94 ($ in  dollars ). Beginning in 1957 All Chrysler products introduced a new torsion bar front suspension, called Torsion-Aire, which replaced the previous coil spring front suspension

The dash had been designed with Chrysler's push-button controls for the TorqueFlite automatic in mind, with the "AstraDome" instrument cluster covering the part of the steering column a column shifter would come out from under then-standard practice, so manual cars used a floor shifter. Due to the installation of the "AstraDome" instrument cluster extending outward towards the steering wheel, the traditional installation of the turn signal lever was relocated to the dashboard underneath the "TorqueFlite" pushbutton gear selectors and was installed as a sliding lever that would return to center as the steering wheel returned to the center position.

Because the program to create all-new Chryslers for 1962 was abruptly canceled in 1960, both of the Town & Country wagons for the 1962 model year (Newport and New Yorker) were instead created by mating their 1961 front ends (updated for 1962) to the body of a 1961 Plymouth 4-door station wagon. The Plymouth wagon was chosen because it was Chrysler Corporation's only finless full-sized station wagon. The Plymouth's existing taillights were replaced by wrap-around units.

For 1963, all Chrysler models including New Yorker standardized on the shorter Newport 122 inch wheelbase. Both New Yorker and Newport trim level Town and Country wagons continued as four-door hardtops through 1964, making Chrysler the last American station wagons offered in this short-lived configuration. Powertrains and standard equipment remained familiar. A 340 hp 4-BBL 413 cu.in. V8 with pushbutton Torqueflite AT, plus power steering and power brakes remained standard on the New Yorker T&C. The Newport T&C shared that model's standard 265 hp 2-BBL 361 cu. in. V8 with 3-speed synchromesh transmission and floor shifter. Both continued to offer 6 and 9 passenger variants, plus a long list of optional equipment. The New Yorker remained unique among large American wagons, offering the option of bucket front seats with center cushion and folding armrest.

1965–1968

All of Chrysler's full-sized cars, except the Imperial, received major makeovers for the 1965 model year. They were the work of Chief of Design, Elwood Engel, who was hired away from Ford Motor Company a few years earlier. The unitized body and chassis, with longitudinal front torsion bars and rear leaf springs, carried over from the prior generation. The wood-sided appearance which was last used in 1950 returned but was simulated. The 1965 New Yorker Town & Country nine passenger station wagon was US$5,033 ($ in  dollars ) and 1,697 were recorded to have been manufactured.

Automatic transmission-equipped cars dropped the dashboard pushbutton shift control and converted to the new industry standard PRNDL sequence shift lever, either column or floor mounted. Dodge and Chrysler models shared passenger compartment structures, thus interior dimensions were essentially identical. The Town and Country wagons shared the  wheelbase and design with Plymouth and Dodge wagons, while other Chrysler body styles rode on a  longer wheelbase. However, the wagons had the same overall length as sedans, at just under . All Chrysler brand models and body styles featured rear wheel opening skirts, including the Town & Country.
 
Thin pillars and tall glass shared with 4 door sedans made for generous space and outward visibility. Straight roof rails on the long roof rack had adjustable cross bars. All Newport models including wagons had a larger standard engine for 1965: The 3.375 inch stroke LB engine was bored to 4.25 inches yielding 383 cubic inches. With a 2BBL carburetor and single exhaust, the regular fuel 383 produced 270 HP. A premium fuel 383 engine with 4BBL and dual exhausts producing 305 HP was an available option. New Yorker wagons continued to feature the 413 cu. in. 4BBL V8, Torqueflite automatic transmission, plus power steering and power brakes as standard equipment. Both trim levels were available in 6 or 9 passenger versions. However, this was the last year that wagons would be available in either New Yorker or Newport trim levels.

For 1966, Town & Country would become a model designation for the one and only wagon in the Chrysler lineup. Exterior trim was similar to the Newport series, with unique taillights. The vinyl bench seat interior shared features with both the Newport and New Yorker series, with the front seat center armrest standard, and simulated woodgrain on the dashboard, resulting in a level of standard trim intermediate between the two sedan series. Individual buckets with center armrest and passenger recliner from the New Yorker option list remained available for one more model year. Chrysler's 2BBL regular fuel 383 V8 became the standard engine, with the 4BBL, dual exhaust, premium fuel 383 V8 available as an option, as on Newport. Unlike Newport, power steering, power brakes and Torqueflite automatic transmission were standard equipment. New in all Chryslers for 1966, the 3.75 inch stroke RB engine was bored to 4.32 inch yielding 440 cubic inches. With a 10.0:1 compression ratio, premium fuel, a 4-barrel carb and dual exhausts, the 440 cubic inch V8 produced 350 HP and was the top power option for the Town & Country. Also available for the first time on all large Chryslers were front disc brakes, which required 15-inch wheels with unique wheel covers. With optional front discs, T&C wagons wore size 8.45x15 extra load range tires. With standard drum brakes, the tire size was 9.00x14.

In 1967, exterior sheet metal for all large Chryslers was new, with a concave side cove as a key design element. Interiors were updated with a new instrument panel, perfectly symmetrical in shape and featuring an inverted fan style speedometer. Chassis dimensions and the greenhouses for 4-door sedans and wagons carried over unchanged. A single Town & Country model in two or three seat versions was offered. The exterior trim matched the Newport series. Interior trim again split the difference between Newport and New Yorker featuring a standard all vinyl notchback bench seat with folding center armrest, and the New Yorker's simulated woodgrain applique on the dashboard. A new seating option was Chrysler's 50/50 3-in-1 split-bench seat, shared with the Newport Custom sedan. Standard and optional powertrains remained the same. Sales literature for 1967 showed front disc brakes as standard equipment on Town & Country, along with the requisite 15-inch wheels, 8.45x15 extra-load tires, and restyled "disc brake" wheel covers. However, many 1967 had 14-inch wheels and Newport wheel covers because they had drum brakes. These wagons were equipped with 8.85x14 tires.

For 1968, all new US cars were equipped with front and rear side marker lights. Chrysler bumpers, grille, hood, deck lid, rear fascia, and lamps all changed significantly, although side sheet metal, wagon tailgate, and rear lamps remained the same. Functionally, there were few changes. Better breathing cylinder heads boosted output of the standard 383 cu. in. 2BBL V8 to 290 HP. Front disc brakes returned to the options list, while front drum brakes and size 8.85x14 tires were standard. Inside, standard notchback and optional 50/50 front seats continued, sharing seat and door trim patterns with the Newport Custom series. The big change in Town & Country appearance came in the form of simulated walnut grain paneling, filling the coved portion of the body sides and surrounded by a stainless steel molding. The wood paneling was standard on all Town & Country wagons, with a delete option offered.

The original Town & Country genuine wood was available on coupes and convertibles as well as wagons, the simulated wood panels were offered as an option on Newport 2-door hardtop and convertible for 1968 and 1969 model years. The appearance was also offered on the Mercury Park Lane hardtop coupe and convertible that was called "yacht deck paneling" and was also not as popular.

1969–1973

For 1969, a major restyle brought a dramatic new look to all full sized Chrysler Corporation cars. Called "fuselage design", it featured a pronounced side curvature from the rocker panels all the way to the roof rails. Plymouth and Dodge models, excluding wagons, shared passenger compartment structures and greenhouses riding on 120-inch and 122-inch wheelbases respectively. Similarly, Chrysler and Imperial models, excluding T&C wagon, shared slightly longer passenger compartments and greenhouses, riding on 124-inch and 127-inch wheelbases respectively (all of the Imperial's longer wheelbase was in the front clip). As in the prior generation, all Chrysler full-sized wagons shared a common greenhouse on a unitized body and chassis with longitudinal front torsion bars, rear leaf springs, and the Dodge's 122-inch wheelbase. As before, the wagon's shorter wheelbase was offset by the additional rear overhang. 1969 Town & Country wagons were nearly identical to other Chrysler body styles in overall length at just under 225 inches. The 1969 Town & Country was US$5,279 ($ in  dollars ) and 24,516 were recorded to have been manufactured.

Fuselage era Chryslers all featured a full-width loop style chrome front bumper. Quad headlamps and grille were recessed inside the loop, with differing grille inserts for each series. Turn signal and parking lamps were recessed into the bumper below the headlamps. Body sides were simple and smooth with a subtle character line originating at the front bumper, descending slightly for the length of the car, and ending at the wrap-around rear bumper. On Town & Country wagons, this character line was also the location of the lower molding surrounding the standard wood grain side paneling, simulated cherry for 1969. The fuselage profile extended the length of a full-sized "long roof" made for a rather striking looking wagon. At the trailing edge of the long roof, body sides, D pillars, and a unique rooftop airfoil formed one continuous arch over the tailgate opening. The airfoil directed airflow from the roof down and over the tail gate window, intended to keep the glass clear of dirt accumulation.

The Town & Country's grille insert and wheel covers for this new generation were from the New Yorker, while front seating choices and interior trim were again drawn from the Newport Custom. The new instrument panel featured a symmetrical padded loop echoing the design theme of the front end. The inverted fan style speedometer from 1967 and 1968 continued, balanced on the passenger side by a large glove box door. A unique Chrysler feature was floodlighting of the instruments and controls instead of more typical backlighting.

For 1969, all full-size Chrysler Corporation vehicles returned to standard 15-inch wheels. This accommodated the growing share of cars equipped with front disc brakes, which were updated to a new simpler and less costly single-piston sliding caliper design from the earlier 4-piston fixed caliper type. Once again, Chrysler sales literature listed power front disc brakes as standard equipment on Town & Country. Some were built with front drum brakes instead. Regardless of brake type, all T&Cs included standard size 8.85x15 tires on 6.5-inch x 15-inch heavy-duty rims. Powertrain choices for the Town & Country remained unchanged.

Chrysler played catch-up on some wagon specific features in 1969: The tailgate became a two-way door-gate, able to swing sideways or drop downward, a feature Ford had pioneered in 1965. Chrysler sought to leapfrog those competitors with a few station wagon exclusive features of its own, including passenger assist handles integrated into the rear opening trim molding, and a tailgate window washer that was contained entirely inside the tailgate.

After so many changes in the prior year, it is no surprise that there were few changes for 1970. Most US makes, including Chrysler, adopted bias-belted tires. They were a short-lived hybrid that combined familiar soft riding bias body plies with tread stabilizing belts used in European style radial tires. One well-known brand name at the time was Goodyear's Polyglas. All 1970 Chryslers featured standard bias-belted tires, with Town & Country wagons wearing size J78-15. J identified the second largest size available in load capacity, 78 indicated a cross-section height-to-width, or aspect ratio of 78%, and 15 being the nominal rim diameter in inches, as before.

A minor styling change found only on the Town & Country for 1970 and 1971 was the addition of a dogleg or kink in the lower body side character line on the rearward half of each rear door. Simulating a styling feature which had been seen on all 1967-1968 Chryslers, and which would return in 1974, this dogleg was simply a new shape for the woodgrain side trim, and involved no special sheet metal. It served to distinguish Chrysler wagons from Dodge and Plymouth models using the same body. Front disc brakes moved back to the options list one last time.

The late 1960s proved to be a financially challenging time for Chrysler Corporation, as tightening emissions standards and safety requirements spread resources thin. Consequently, the biennial mid-cycle face-lift originally intended to be the new model year 1971 corporate large car lineup was postponed one year. Thus, all 1971 Chryslers, including the Town & Country, looked virtually unchanged from the prior year. One interior change planned that did make it into the 1971 cars was the instrument panel surround... Its upper bolster became a bit more massive, while the lower bolster was reduced in size eliminating the lower ledge. and the glove box door received a color-keyed overlay. Standard tires for the wagons were enlarged to L84x15, a size shared with the Imperial, and unique to Chrysler Corp. Torsion Quiet Ride, comprising a set of tuned rubber isolators for the front suspension sub-frame and rear leaf-spring mounts, was added to wagons. It had been introduced as a new feature for all other Chrysler models and body styles in 1970. Front disc brakes became standard equipment on the Town & Country.

Additional changes were related to Federal Emission Standards and the requirement that 1971 cars run on unleaded regular-grade gasoline. Compression ratios on all engines were reduced to ~8.5:1. For just this year, engine power and torque specifications were advertised using both the familiar SAE gross rating method (for the last time), and SAE net rating method, which remains the standard today. (Net ratings are more representative of engine output as-installed since they measure output when the engine is fully "dressed" with production intake and exhaust plumbing, cooling system, and accessory loads in place.) Revised ratings for Town & Country engines were: 383 cu. in. 2-BBL V8: 75 (190 net) hp with 375 (305 net) lb-ft; 383 cu. In. 4-BBL V8: 300 (240 net) hp with 410 (310 net) lb-ft; 440 cu. In. 4-BBL: 335 (220 net) hp with 460 (350 net) lb-ft. Dual exhaust systems were no longer used.

For 1972, the mid-cycle restyle originally intended for the prior year made its appearance. The overall design of Chrysler models remained very similar. The uni-body platform and all key dimensions remained unchanged. The fuselage theme evolved toward an even simpler body side, still with a subtle rearward sloping character line, but with a squared off shoulder at the window sill. The front bumper retained its loop form, adding a center divider splitting the grille into halves. Greenhouses for all four-door models remained unchanged, while two-door coupe rooflines grew more formal, and convertibles were dropped. After many years of declining sales, the 300 series was eliminated, replaced by a New Yorker Brougham series with plusher interior choices and more standard equipment, slotted between the Imperial and New Yorker.

For 1972, the Town & Country borrowed most of its exterior trim from the New Yorker. Die-cast grille inserts were shared with New Yorker, and rear-wheel openings once again wore fender skirts. Brushed bright metal moldings about two inches wide ran the length of the car from the front bumper to rear, and served as the lower border for the standard simulated wood grain side panels. Standard wheel covers were shared with the Newport and were identical to the 1969 wheel covers, then shared with the New Yorker. Inside, the front seating choices and door trim were again shared with the Newport Custom. Seatbacks for the standard notch-back front seat featured a high back design with integrated headrests. Chrysler's two-way door-gate became a three-way, able to open as door with the glass up.
 
Unfortunately, as the Town & Country (and every other car in the '70s) grew heavier, available powertrain choices became fewer and weaker. Compression ratios were further reduced to 8.2:1. An increase in bore from 4.25 inches in the 383 to 4.34 inches produced a new LB series engine displacement of 400 cu. in. With a 2-BBL carburetor, it just matched the 190 net horsepower and  net torque ratings of the prior year 383s. The only remaining optional engine was the 440 cu. in. 4-BBL V8 producing 215 net horsepower and  net torque. Even so, the updated Town & Country with its more imposing grille and nicely integrated fender skirts set sales records, with 6,473 six-passenger and 14,116 nine passenger wagons produced for the model year.

1973 was the fifth and final year of what had been planned as a four-year platform cycle. A federal mandate to equip MY 1973 cars with bumpers that could absorb up to  impacts with no functional damage was a challenge since the large cars Chrysler had designed to comply with this standard were delayed until MY 1974. The stopgap solution was to replace the fuselage era signature loop front bumpers with a generic looking grille and conventional-looking bumpers wearing large black rubber impact absorbers, front and rear. Apart from  bumpers, other changes for the 1973 Town & Country were few: The 50/50 3 in 1 front seat had proven sufficiently popular that it became standard equipment, as did the higher torque 440 cu.in. V8 engine, which featured standard electronic ignition for the first time.

1974–1977

For the 1974 model year Chrysler introduced its new large car lineup originally planned a year earlier.  The timing could hardly have been worse... The Arab oil embargo of late 1973 had Americans waiting in line for gasoline coast to coast, sometimes for hours. Big cars quickly became a glut on the market, despite the fact that Chrysler's new models were some of the best large cars Chrysler had produced in years. The new styling was a clear departure from the fuselage generation and appeared to share the proportions and design cues of GM's 1971 large car redesign. The body sides had a more pronounced tumble home. A-pillars were thin, and beltlines were lower, yielding significantly more glass area. Energy-absorbing bumpers were integrated into the designs, front and rear. The 1975 Town & Country nine passenger station wagon was US$8,099 ($ in  dollars ) and 4,764 were recorded to have been manufactured.

For this generation, full-sized Plymouths and Dodges, excluding wagons, shared more than just body shells. They also shared a common 122-inch wheelbase, instrument panels, and most exterior body stampings. Likewise, Chrysler and Imperial models shared slightly longer body shells on a common 124-inch wheelbase, plus instrument panels, and exterior body stampings. And, once again, Chrysler Corporation wagons would share a common greenhouse across divisions... although this time, all wagons would roll on the longer Chrysler 124" wheelbase. All remained large enough to swallow the ubiquitous 4x8 sheet of plywood flat on its floor with the three-way door-gate closed... no evidence of any attempt to follow GM's clamshell-style rear closure, fortunately. The roof was slightly elevated aft of the C-pillar, and a body-colored air deflector at the trailing edge remained a standard feature, although it was no longer integrated into the body structure. Fully skirted rear wheel openings and simulated woodgrain side and doorgate panel appliqués remained standard equipment on all Town and Country wagons.

A significant safety improvement was achieved with the relocation of the fuel tank from the left rear quarter, where it was placed since the 1950s, to under the floor just behind the rear axle. Underfloor storage space was reduced on 2-seat wagons, but revisions in the 3rd seat folding mechanism minimized any compromises in seating utility. Space freed up in the left rear quarter panel became a lockable storage compartment.

Although the overall size of 1974 Chryslers was barely larger than the fuselage generation that preceded it, the overall weight continued to increase. Additional emission controls, safety features, and growing standard equipment lists were having the same effect on every automaker. The 3-seat T&C now weighed just under 5,000 pounds, about 300 pounds heavier than the 1972 fuselage generation T&C. With air conditioning, and a typical complement of power assists, the average '74 T&C weighed about 5,200 pounds. Standard tires were L78x15 bias belted on 6.5x15 inch rims. Steel belted radials were optional.

For 1975, changes were few, and most were shared across the entire US industry, including Chrysler. Those lower rolling resistance radial-ply tires became standard equipment, in size LR78x15 for the Town and Country. Every Chrysler was equipped with an exhaust system catalytic converter for the first time, requiring unleaded gasoline to run properly. The 400 cu.in. 2BBL V8 engine returned as a fuel economy alternative to the still standard 440 engine. And, as a minor appearance upgrade for all Chrysler models: Lower instrument panels, steering columns, and steering wheels became color-coordinated, rather than the previous black finish.

1975 was a year of product line consolidation for Chrysler. The Imperial marque was discontinued. No longer a separate model, but a highly trimmed Chrysler, the Imperial could not compete effectively with Cadillac, Lincoln, or premium European brands. The Imperial's unique trim (the waterfall grille, concealed headlamps, extended rear fenders, vertical tail lamps, and "lose pillow" upholstery seating) became the 1976 New Yorker Brougham. Similarly, what had been New Yorker interior and exterior trim became the 1976 Newport Custom. The Town and Country continued unchanged inside and out. It remained as large and well equipped as ever, but the market's interest in giant luxury station wagons was waning.

1977 would be the last year of Chrysler Town and Country as a traditional American full-sized premium station wagon. Both GM and Ford would downsize and continue traditional big wagons, thru the 1980s for Ford, and into the 1990s for GM. But at Chrysler, the beloved Town and Country moniker would take on new roles in new market segments.

1978–1981 

From 1978 through 1981, the Town & Country badge designated the simulated wood-trimmed wagon model of the mid-sized Chrysler LeBaron series, built on the Chrysler M platform, which included Plymouth Gran Fury, Dodge Diplomat, and Chrysler LeBaron. Although trimmed more elegantly inside and out, there were not many substantial differences in the chassis and powertrain, between Chrysler's downsized intermediate line-up and its compact rear wheel drive Dodge Aspen/Plymouth Volare models introduced in 1976. Wheelbases, tread width, and interior dimensions were identical, leaving only front/rear overhangs and overall length to differentiate mid-sized from the compact.

1982–1988 

For model years 1982 through 1988, the Town & Country name was featured on the wagon version of the K-body based front wheel drive LeBaron, featuring simulated woodgrain exterior trim. A limited production convertible version was manufactured for model years 1983 to 1986 and also featured simulated woodgrain paneling and was meant to reflect the classic look of original 1940s and early 1950s convertibles. The convertibles came standard with Mark Cross leather interior.

Chrysler's K-body platform models, including the LeBaron-based Town & Countries, were eventually phased out by the late 1980s. The Town & Country name was briefly absent from the start of the 1989 model year, but returned for 1990 on a new luxury Chrysler Town & Country minivan. Like most Town & Country models of the past, the new minivan also featured woodgrain exterior trim.

1990–2016 

Initially planned for the 1989 model year, the Chrysler Town & Country returned in the spring of 1989 as an early 1990 model year introduction, only this time around, it became part of the new Chrysler Town & Country luxury minivan line up, which was based on the Dodge Grand Caravan and Plymouth Grand Voyager minivan cousins, each of which, were added to Chrysler's corporate minivan line up during the start of the 1987 model year as long-wheelbase/extended-length versions of their standard-wheelbase/standard-length Dodge Caravan and Plymouth Voyager minivan cousins, which had been introduced for the first time ever during the start of the 1984 model year line up. After its return early in the start of the 1990 model year line up, the Chrysler Town & Country minivan has been redesigned for the 1991, 1996, 2001, and 2008 model years, with each following generation adding new technology and with numerous industry firsts.

References

External links 

The original Town & Country Woodie
Chrysler LeBaron and Town & Country
1969 - 1973 Chrysler Town & Country Station Wagons at Fuselage.de site

Station wagons
Town and Country
Rear-wheel-drive vehicles
Front-wheel-drive vehicles
1950s cars
1960s cars
1970s cars
1980s cars
Cars introduced in 1941